The International Council Correspondence was a council communist magazine published in Chicago from 1934 to 1943. In 1938, it changed its name to Living Marxism and again to New Essays in 1942.

Paul Mattick was the chief editor and main contributor, Karl Korsch, Anton Pannekoek, Max Nomad, Daniel Guérin, Otto Rühle, Dwight Macdonald and Victor Serge also published in the ICC. 

The magazine's original purpose was to correspond with fellow council communists, primarily in Europe. It changed its name as the European council communists began to go underground in the late 1930s. 

The magazine was published by the United Workers Party, later known as the Council communists, which had split from the Proletarian Party of America in 1934. A complete reprint of the magazine was published in the 1970s by Greenwood Reprints with an introduction by Paul Mattick.

References

External links 
 International Council Correspondence, contents 1934-43

Communist magazines
Council communism
Defunct political magazines published in the United States
Magazines established in 1934
Magazines disestablished in 1943
Marxist magazines
Magazines published in Chicago